Diligente was a 26-gun frigate of the French Navy. Originally built for the French East India Company, she was purchased by the Navy and took part in the War of American Independence.

Career 
Diligente was built at Lorient as an East Indiaman for the French East India Company, and was completed in December 1756. She departed for her first journey on 31.

On 26 March 1761, she arrived in Brest, returning from her second journey to India. The next month, the Navy purchased her and commissioned her as a frigate.

In 1776, she was under Lieutenant Amblimont, part on the escadre d'évolution under Duchaffault.

In September 1778, she took part in the Invasion of Dominica, along with the frigates Tourterelle and Amphitrite, and the corvette French corvette Étourdie (1762). She later took part in the French invasion of Saint Martin on 29 February 1779 under Du Chilleau.

In late September and October 1780 the French frigates  (26 guns) and Diligente, were escorting a convoy from Rochefort to Bayonne. The French took Alert and Jersey into service, Alerte as Alerte.{

Diligentewas at the Battle of Fort Royal on 29 April and 30 April 1781, under Mortemart.

In September, she ferried troops to support the Siege of Yorktown.

Fate 
Diligente was wrecked at Cape Henry in January 1782.

Citations and references 
Citations

References
 
 
  (1671-1870)

Age of Sail frigates of France
Blonde-class frigates
Ships built in France
1756 ships
Maritime incidents in 1782